Jayapal is a surname of Indian origin. It may refer to:

 K. A. Jayapal (born 1955), Indian politician
 Pramila Jayapal (born 1965), American politician
 Puttarangaiah Jayapal (born 1972), Indian cricket umpire
 Susheela Jayapal (born 1962), American politician
 Vijay Jayapal, Indian director

Surnames of Indian origin